This was the first edition of the tournament.

Top seeds Eri Hozumi and Miyu Kato won the title, defeating Nicole Gibbs and Asia Muhammad in the final, 6–7(3–7), 6–3, [10–8].

Seeds

Draw

References 
 Draw

Hawaii Tennis Open
Hawaii Tennis Open - Doubles
2016 in sports in Hawaii